Umar Marvi  (Sindhi: عمر مارئي),, is a Pakistani film adapted from a popular Sindhi folk tale, Umar Marvi, produced by Syed Hussain Ali Shah Fazlani, directed by Shaikh Hassan and starring Fazlani himself, Nighat Sultana, Noor Mohammed Charlie and Bibbo. Released on March 12, 1956, it was the first ever Sindhi language feature film made in Pakistan.

Plot
The story of Marvi and Umar is a popular Sindhi folk tale, on which the poet Shah Abdul Latif Bhittai based one of the surs of his Risalo. Umar (Syed Hussain Ali Shah Fazlani), king of Umarkot, is looking for a bride but finds none to his liking. Phog (Noor Mohammed Charlie) mentions the unmatchable beauty of Marvi (Nighat Sultana), a village girl from Malir whom he loves but who is engaged to a fellow villager, Khet. Umar decides to check out Marvi for himself and immediately falls under her spell. After unsuccessfully asking for her hand from her father, he resolves to abduct her. Confined in Umar's palace, Marvi stubbornly refuses to become his wife, faithful to her pledge to Khet. Turning down silks and jewelry, she longs for her people, the Marus. When Marvi seems about to surrender, having lost hope of being rescued, a wet-nurse reveals that they are milk siblings, thus ruling out any possibility of marriage between them. Umar then hands Marvi back to her people, but Khet and the Marus suspect her chastity. Upon hearing the news, Umar goes for Malir to defend Marvi's honor. Both have to undergo a trial to prove their innocence by walking through a fire holding a red-hot iron rod. Umar and Marvi come out of the pyre unhurt. In the end, Umar accepts his mistake and blesses Marvi and Khet as they finally marry.

Reception and awards
The film met with wide popular success both in India and Pakistan. After its release in Pakistan, the rights of the movie were bought by an Indian distributor named T.M. Bihari.
Suhail Hashmi and M. Iqbal received civil awards from the President of Pakistan (sadarti awards) for their role, respectively, as director of photography and art director.

Cast
 Syed Hussain Ali Shah Fazlani as Umar
 Nighat Sultana as Marvi
 Noor Mohammed Charlie as Phog
 Bibbo

See also
 Umar Marvi
 Sindhi folklore
 Sindhi cinema
 List of Sindhi-language films

References

Further reading
 Gazdar, Mushtaq. 1997. Pakistan Cinema, 1947-1997. Karachi: Oxford University Press.
 Levesque, Julien & Bui, Camille. 2014. "Umar Marvi and the Representation of Sindh: Cinema and Modernity in the Margins". Bioscope: South Asian Screen Studies, vol. 5, n°2, July 2014 .

External links
 Umer Marvi at IMDB.com

Sindhi-language films
Pakistani fantasy films
1956 films
Pakistani romance films
Pakistani black-and-white films